The Eastern District is one of the primary districts of American Samoa. It consists of the eastern portion of Tutuila, American Samoa's largest island, plus the island of Aunu'u. The district has a land area of 67.027 km2 (25.879 sq mi) and a 2010 census population of 23,030. It contains 34 villages plus a portion of Nu'uuli village. Among these are Pago Pago, Fagatogo, and Utulei.

District divisions
Eastern District is further divided into counties:
Ituau County
Ma'oputasi County
Sa'Ole County
Sua County
Vaifanua County

History
Already at the time of joining the union in 1900, Tutuila Island had well defined, traditional political divisions. The eastern part of Tutuila had five traditional “counties” grouped under the name “Sua ma Vaifanua.” American Samoa's first Governor, Commander B. F. Tilley, named this region the “Eastern District” and one of the area's chiefs was appointed as District Governor. Under the District Governor were five traditional counties within the district. Each of the counties contained several villages, and Governor B. F. Tilley selected a leading chief from each village and appointed him to be “Pulenuu” (mayor). All these appointments were based on recommendations Tilley had received in the specific counties and villages. The western part of the island had been known as Fofō and Aitulagi, but was renamed the “Western District” by Tilley.

It was the Eastern District which in 1935 brought a resolution that requested the establishment of a legislative body (Fono). The district's delegates elected Tuiasosopo Mariota to argue their case. Governor Otto Carl Dowling declined the request, claiming only the U.S. Congress had the right to establish such a legislature. High Talking Chief Tuiasosopo would become one of American Samoa's most prominent leaders in the mid-1940s. The Governor's decision was reversed by Governor Vernon Huber in 1948.

Demographics

Eastern District of Tutuila was first recorded beginning with the 1900 U.S. Census. No census was taken in 1910, but a special census was taken in 1912. Regular decennial censuses were taken beginning in 1920.

Between the 2000 U.S. Census and the 2010 U.S. Census, the Eastern District's population decreased by 1.8 percent. Some counties, however, experienced population growth. These include Sa'Ole County, which experienced the district's highest population growth at 23.7 percent. Vaifanua County experienced a 13.2 percent population increase, while also Ituau County experienced population growth (8.4 percent). The largest population decline took place in Maoputasi County (-11.9%), where nearly all communities experienced a population decline, including American Samoa's capital area of Pago Pago and Fagatogo. Sua County also experienced population loss, although much lower at -2.8 percent.

See also
Manu'a District, American Samoa
Western District, American Samoa

References

 American Samoa, its districts and unorganized islands; United States Census Bureau

Districts of American Samoa
Tutuila